is a Japanese actor and voice actor from Hyōgo Prefecture. He is affiliated with the Seinenza Theater Company, and graduated from the Osaka University of Arts.

Filmography

Television animation
Eat-Man (1997-1998) (Nowāru)
Berserk (1997-1998) (Pipin)
Chūka Ichiban (1997-1998) (Rōko)
Initial D: Fourth Stage (1998-2014) (Aikawa/Man in Evo V)
Trigun (1998) (Monev the Gale)
Arc the Lad (1999) (Dain)
Wild Arms: Twilight Venom (1999-2000) (Korī)
Rave Master (2002) (Fūa)
Burst Angel (2004) (Tetsuzō)
Naruto (2004) (Manda)
Pokémon (2004) (Silver)
Monster (2004-2005) (Inspector Gantz)
Black Cat (2005) (Ganza)
Bleach (2007) (Mock Arrancar)
Fullmetal Alchemist: Brotherhood (2009) (Darius)
Ikki Tousen: Xtreme Xecutor (2010) (King Bokuroku)
Mitsudomoe (2010-2011) (Marui Soujirou)
Seikon no Qwaser (2010) (Croa)
SD Gundam Sangokuden Brave Battle Warriors (2010-2011) (Shuusou Dovenwolf)
One Piece (2012) (Raochutan (ep. 542))
DokiDoki! PreCure (2013-2014) (Gula)
Gate: Jieitai Kanochi nite, Kaku Tatakaeri (2015-2016) (Dulan)
JoJo's Bizarre Adventure: Diamond Is Unbreakable (2016) (Male)
91 Days (2016) (Ganzo Alary)
High School DxD Hero (2018) (Hades)
The Idaten Deities Know Only Peace (2021) (Nept)

Original Video Animation
Ninja Resurrection (xxxx) (Hozoin Inshun)

Video games
Spyro 2: Ripto's Rage! (2000) (Moneybags)
Final Fantasy X (2001) (Jecht)
Final Fantasy X-2 (2003) (Jecht)
True Crime: Streets of LA (2004) (Big Chong)
Initial D: Street Stage (2006) (Aikawa/Man in Evo V)
Yakuza 2 (2006) (Jin Goda)
Dissidia: Final Fantasy (2008) (Jecht)
Dissidia 012 Final Fantasy (2011) (Jecht)
Initial D Arcade Stage 8 Infinity ∞ (2014) (Aikawa/Man in Evo V)
Dissidia Final Fantasy NT (2017) (Jecht)

Live action
B-Fighter Kabuto (1996-1997) (Cold-Blooded Armored General Mukaderinger (eps. 28 - 35, 38 - 45, 47 - 49))
Kaizoku Sentai Gokaiger (2011) (Salamandam (ep. 3))
Doubutsu Sentai Zyuohger (2016) (Sumotoron (ep. 33))

Dubbing roles

Live action
.45 (Big Al (Angus Macfadyen))
15 Minutes (Oleg Razgul (Oleg Taktarov))
The Admiral: Roaring Currents (Wakisaka Yasuharu (Cho Jin-woong))
The Big Hit (Crunch (Bokeem Woodbine))
Bridge of Dragons (Emmerich (Gary Hudson))
The Bucket List (Roger Chambers (Alfonso Freeman))
Chocolate (No. 8 (Pongpat Wachirabunjong))
Cleveland Abduction (Ariel Castro (Raymond Cruz))
Cross Wars (Muerte (Danny Trejo))
The Crow (1997 TV Tokyo edition) (T-Bird (David Patrick Kelly))
Dolemite Is My Name (Ben Taylor (Craig Robinson))
Dreamer (Balon (Luis Guzmán))
ER (Henry "Rena" Colton (Vondie Curtis-Hall))
Fantastic Four (The Thing (Michael Chiklis))
Fantastic Four: Rise of the Silver Surfer (The Thing (Michael Chiklis))
Fatherhood (Howard (Paul Reiser))
Hidalgo (Aziz (Adam Alexi-Malle))
Jarhead (Staff Sgt. Sykes (Jamie Foxx))
Killing Me Softly (Klaus (Ulrich Thomsen))
Killing Them Softly (Mickey (James Gandolfini))
Léon: The Professional (1996 TV Asahi edition) (Benny (Keith A. Glascoe))
Mesrine (Paul (Gilles Lellouche))
Miami Vice (Ricardo Tubbs (Jamie Foxx))
Mission: Impossible – Ghost Protocol (Brij Nath (Anil Kapoor))
Mortal Engines (Stigwood (Mark Hadwood))
Paddington 2 (T-Bone (Tom Davis))
Real (Jo Won-geun (Sung Dong-il))
The Rum Diary (Bob Sala (Michael Rispoli))
The Taking of Pelham 123 (John Johnson (Michael Rispoli))
This Is the End (Craig Robinson)
Three (Fatty (Lam Suet))
Three Kings (Staff Sergeant Chief Elgin (Ice Cube))
The Young Master (Bull (Fan Mei-Sheng))
xXx (El Jefe (Danny Trejo))

Animation
Brave (Lord MacGuffin)
Flushed Away (Whitey)
Planes: Fire & Rescue (Chug)

References

External links
Official agency profile 

1958 births
Living people
Japanese male video game actors
Japanese male voice actors
Male voice actors from Hyōgo Prefecture
20th-century Japanese male actors
21st-century Japanese male actors